HTA  may refer to:

Education 
 Hawaii Technology Academy
 High Tech Academy, in Cleveland, Ohio, United States
 High Tech Academy (Highland Springs, Virginia), United States
 Holy Trinity Academy (disambiguation)
 Home Team Academy, a government training institute in Singapore

Other uses 
 Hapoel Tel Aviv F.C., an Israeli football club
 Hard Truck Apocalypse, a video game
 Harris Tweed Authority, a Scottish statutory public body
 Health technology assessment, a multidisciplinary policy analysis methodology
 Health Technology Assessment, a journal
 Heavier than air
 Helitrans, a Norwegian airline
 Hierarchical task analysis
 Highway Traffic Act (Ontario)
 Hizb ut-tahrir America, an American Islamic organization
 Home team advantage, a sports term
 Home Technology Association, an industry association
 Horticultural Trades Association
 Hot Thespian Action, a Canadian sketch comedy troupe
 HTML Application, a user interface markup language originated by Microsoft
 Human Tissue Authority, of the British Department of Health
 Humboldt Transit Authority
 Kadala Airport, in Russia